Sangola Vidhan Sabha constituency (253) is one of the 288 Vidhan Sabha (legislative assembly) constituencies of Maharashtra state, western India. This constituency is located in Solapur district. The constituency is not reserved constituency. It is a part of Madha Lok Sabha constituency along with five other Vidhan Sabha segments, namely Madha, Karmala and Malshiras in Solapur district and Phaltan and Man in Satara district.

Geographical scope
The constituency comprises Sangola taluka and Jilhaparishad gat(Bhalavani) from Pandharpur taluka.

Members of Vidhan Sabha

^ by-poll

References

Assembly constituencies of Solapur district
Assembly constituencies of Maharashtra